Holloway Terrace is an unincorporated community in New Castle County, Delaware, United States. Holloway Terrace is located on the outskirts of the city of Wilmington along Delaware Route 9 and Interstate 295, southwest of the Port of Wilmington.

History
Lots in the community, an early suburb of Wilmington, were first sold in May 1916. The Wilmington Evening Journal reported that 300 plots of land had sold on the first day; these sales included subscriptions to the Evening Journal.

Holloway Terrace was adjacent to the New Castle Trolley Line.

The residents formed the Holloway Terrace Civic Association and Volunteer Fire Company No. 1 on September 20, 1921, to provide representation and protection for the community. 

By 1966, Holloway Terrace had a population of 1,100. This area continued to grow, and by the 1970s, the majority of Delawareans lived in the suburbs surrounding Wilmington, including early suburbs like Holloway Terrace, Claymont, and Holly Oak.

References

External links

Unincorporated communities in New Castle County, Delaware
Unincorporated communities in Delaware